Fatih Dönmez (born 1965, Bilecik) is a Turkish engineer, politician and the current Turkish Minister of Energy and Natural Resources.

Education and early life 
Fatih Dönmez was born in Bilecik and attended primary, secondary and high school in Istanbul. He studied electronic engineering at the Yildiz Technical University, from which he graduated in 1987. In 2005 he obtained also a Master of Business Administration.

Professional career 
IGDAS is administered by the Municipality of Istanbul. Amongst other positions, he also served as a member of the board and its Vice General Manager.

Political career 
On 24 December 2015, he began to work as Undersecretary in the Ministry of Energy and Natural Resources of Berat Albayrak. On the 10 July 2018, he succeeded Berat Albayrak and was appointed as Minister of Energy and Natural Resources in the Government of Recep Tayyip Erdoğan. In January 2020, he took part in the launch of the pipeline TurkStream, which transports Russian natural gas to Turkey and Europe. He is also in favor of the re-negotiation of the Treaty of Lausanne, which settled the borders between Greece and Turkey.

Personal life 
Fatih Dönmez is married and is the father of three children.

References 

Turkish politicians
Turkish engineers
People from Bilecik
1965 births
Living people
Yıldız Technical University alumni
Ministers of Energy and Natural Resources of Turkey